Mir-Mahna (sometimes spelled Mir Mahna) is a computer game based on the life of Mir Mahna, an amir of Kharg, Iran who successfully fought against Dutch colonial forces in Iran during the reign of Nader Shah in the 1740s. Introduced in August 2010 at Gamescom, Mir-Mahna officially was released in Tehran, Iran in February 2011 and was supported by the Iran Computer and Video Games Foundation.

Mir-Mahna is the first Iranian game about the life of a contemporary Iranian hero and the second game after Garshasp Gorz-e-Serit to focus on Iranian heroes. The game's storyline is based on a series of books entitled On the Red Marine Roads by Nader Ebrahimi, an Iranian writer, screenwriter, photographer, director and actor. By using traditional Iranian music with modern computer motion capture, the game designers sought to introduce Iranian culture and civilization worldwide. This was part of a larger effort by the Iranian government to use computer games to help convey its culture.

References

External links
 
 

2011 video games
First-person shooters
Video games developed in Iran
Video games set in Iran
Video games set in the 18th century
Video games set on islands
Windows games
Windows-only games